Chirumanzu–Zibagwe  is a constituency of the National Assembly of the Parliament of Zimbabwe, located in the Chirumhanzu District in Midlands Province. Mvuma, a small mining town, is one of the largest commercial centers in the constituency. The constituency was created in 2008 from the old Chirumanzu and Zhombe constituencies. Emmerson Mnangagwa, now the President of Zimbabwe, was the inaugural member, followed by his wife, Auxillia Mnangagwa. Its current Member of Parliament is Prosper Machando (ZANU–PF).

History 
Chirumanzu–Zibagwe was created prior to the 2008 Zimbabwean general election, with territory taken from the old Chirumanzu and Zhombe constituencies. It stretches all the way from Mvuma, east side of the Harare-Masvingo Highway to the west side of the Harare-Bulawayo Highway to areas which were formerly under Zhombe constituency. It also covers places like Rukundo and Netherburn along the Gweru-Mvuma Highway.

Emmerson Mnangagwa won the constituency in 2008, and was reelected in 2013. In a 2015 by-election, his wife Auxillia Mnangagwa was elected to replace her husband, who vacated the seat when he became Vice-President of Zimbabwe. In 2018, Mnangagwa announced that she would not be running for reelection to Parliament in order to focus more on her role as First Lady. Her successor, the incumbent Prosper Machando, won the seat in the July 2018 general election.

Demographics 
In 2011, Chirumanzu–Zibagwe had a population of 40,185 people in 10,246 households. In 2011, the constituency had 19,566 registered voters, or 48% of the population. The constituency had 38 primary schools with 292 teachers serving 24,041 students, and 13 secondary schools with 2,887 pupils and 112 teachers. There are 11 health facilities in the constituency, including five hospitals.

List of members

Electoral history

See also

List of Zimbabwean parliamentary constituencies

References

2008 establishments in Zimbabwe
Parliamentary constituencies in Zimbabwe